Daniel Daikawa (born April 8, 1971) is an American-born Japanese former ice hockey player. He was the general manager and head coach of the Brookings Blizzard of the North American Hockey League from 2014 to 2017.

Daikawa competed in the 1998, 1999, 2001 Men's World Ice Hockey Championships, and 2003 Men's World Ice Hockey Championships as a member of the Japan men's national ice hockey team.

Awards and honors

References

External links

Jamestown Ironmen - Personnel

1971 births
American men's ice hockey defensemen
Ice hockey players from Minnesota
Japanese ice hockey players
Japanese people of American descent
Naturalized citizens of Japan
Kokudo Keikaku players
Living people
Miami RedHawks men's ice hockey players
North Iowa Huskies players
Oji Eagles players
Seibu Prince Rabbits players
People from Apple Valley, Minnesota
Asian Games gold medalists for Japan
Asian Games silver medalists for Japan
Medalists at the 1999 Asian Winter Games
Medalists at the 2003 Asian Winter Games
Ice hockey players at the 1999 Asian Winter Games
Ice hockey players at the 2003 Asian Winter Games
Asian Games medalists in ice hockey